Animo is a Latin legal term meaning 'with intention' or 'with purpose'.

References

Latin legal terminology